Gremlins 2: The New Batch is a platform video game developed and published by Sunsoft for the Nintendo Entertainment System and Game Boy video game systems in 1990. The game was released in conjunction with the film from Warner Bros. and Amblin Entertainment.

Gameplay 
In the NES game, the player controls Gizmo through various levels in the building, armed with weapons ranging from the genetically modified super tomato in the laboratory to the new matchstick-firing bow in the later sections. The goal of the game is to reach the Gremlin Control Center to wipe out all Gremlins inside. The Game Boy version was a side-scroller also featuring Gizmo.

Other versions 
The Spanish company Topo Soft and Motivetime developed a sidescrolling Gremlins 2: The New Batch video game for Amiga, Atari ST, Commodore 64, DOS, MSX, Amstrad CPC and the ZX Spectrum, distributed by Erbe Software and Topo Soft in Spain and by Elite abroad, being the first time a Spanish videogame company got an exclusive license from a Hollywood movie to make a videogame. The game had featured Billy Peltzer using a wide variety of weapons (flashlights, tomatoes, Frisbees and the like) to dispatch of Gremlin adversaries. The goal in each of the five levels is to locate a specific item required to see the game's good ending.

Hi Tech Expressions also released a DOS game in 1991, but it was poorly received.

References 

1990 video games
Commodore 64 games
Game Boy games
Gremlins (franchise)
Hi Tech Expressions games
Nintendo Entertainment System games
Platform games
Single-player video games
Sunsoft games
Topo Soft games
Video game sequels
Video games based on films
Video games developed in Japan
Video games scored by Naoki Kodaka